State Road 585 (SR 585) was a , north–south state highway in Tampa, Florida connecting U.S. Route 41 Business (US 41 Bus.) with Interstate 4 (I-4) and US 92. The completion of the I-4/Selmon Expressway Connector provided a new corridor for traffic traveling between the two freeways, resulting in the Florida Department of Transportation relinquishing SR 585 to the city of Tampa in December 2016.

Route description
SR 585's southern terminus was at SR 60 which also carries US 41 Bus. and SR 45. Here acting as a one-way pair, SR 585's northbound lanes were carried on 22nd Street while the southbound lanes were on 21st Street. Interstate 4 was the next major intersection of SR 585. The two sets of streets merged where it continued north on 22nd Street to intersect SR 574. The northern terminus of SR 585 was US 92 where the roadway continued north as 22nd Street. SR 585 was to the east side of Downtown Tampa but remained within the city limits throughout its entire course.

Major intersections

References

External links

585
585